Jade Cargo International was a cargo airline with its headquarters on the sixth floor of the Shenzhen Airlines Flight Operations Building at Shenzhen Bao'an International Airport, Bao'an District, Shenzhen, Guangdong, China. It operated regular cargo services to Asia, Europe, South East Asia and the Middle East, plus a host of other worldwide destinations. It main base was Shenzhen Bao'an International Airport.

History
Jade Cargo International was established in October 2004 and was co-owned by Shenzhen Airlines, which had a 51% stake, Lufthansa Cargo with 25% and DEG – Deutsche Investitions- und Entwicklungsgesellschaft mbH, a subsidiary of German state-owned bank KfW – with 24%. 
It started operations in August, 2006. It was the first cargo airline in China with foreign ownership and had 350 employees (as of March 2009).

On December 25, 2011, flew its last scheduled flight, as JI7466 from Frankfurt (FRA) to Shanghai (PVG), via Shenyang (SHE), and a few days later, on December 31, 2011, officially grounded its fleet, citing a combination of lack of demand and “extended discussions” with Jade Cargo's other owners, with the service suspension lasting for several weeks until new funding was to be found through UniTop Group, which had plans to restructure the airline.

Late in May, 2012, UniTop withdrew its Letter of Intent (LOI) for the restructuring plans. Immediately Jade Cargo Int'l officially announced the closure of the company and the start of liquidation proceedings effective June 4, 2012.

In 2017, three former Jade Cargo Boeing 747 planes (B-2421, B-2422, and B-2423) were up for auction on Taobao. On the 20th of November 2017, SF Airlines purchased two of the three Boeing 747 planes on TaoBao, each for over ¥160,000,000 Chinese Yuan.

Destinations
Jade Cargo served the following cities as of December 2011:

Fleet

The Jade Cargo International fleet consisted of the following aircraft (as of June 2015):

See also 
 Shenzhen Airlines
 Lufthansa Cargo

References

External links 

Jade Cargo International
Jade Cargo International fleet details 

Defunct airlines of China
Airlines established in 2004
Airlines disestablished in 2011
Companies based in Shenzhen
Cargo airlines of China